Böhmfeld is a municipality in the district of Eichstätt in Bavaria in Germany.

History
1602: About 400 people lived in Böhmfeld in 63 houses. 
School houses were built in 1777, 1839, 1892 and 1962. 
In 1806 Böhmfeld came to the newly founded Kingdom of Bavaria. 
After 1945 refugees came to Böhmfeld.

Mayor

1984–2020: Alfred Ostermeier (SPD/FW)
since 2020: Jürgen Nadler (SPD/FW)

References

Eichstätt (district)